Payara Server is an open-source application server derived from GlassFish Server Open Source Edition. It was created in 2014 by C2B2 Consulting as a drop in replacement for GlassFish after Oracle announced it was discontinuing commercial support for GlassFish. By comparison to GlassFish, Payara Server is released more frequently on a quarterly basis with added bug fixes, patches and enhancements. Since April 2016 Payara Server is sponsored by Payara Services Ltd who are responsible for ongoing development and coordinating community contributions. Officially compatible with Jakarta EE and MicroProfile.

Overview
Payara Server has been developed in 2014 as a fork and drop in replacement for GlassFish Server Open Source Edition. It was released in October 2014 in response to Oracle’s announcement to end commercial support for GlassFish. Commercial support and enterprise services for Payara Server users is currently provided by Payara Services Ltd.

Payara Server is derived from the upstream GlassFish source tree with Payara’s own enhancements and fixes. Development of Payara Server is independent from Oracle’s development of GlassFish, and Payara Server releases are always based on the most recent version of GlassFish.

Payara Server is dual licensed under both the Common Development and Distribution License (CDDL) Version 1.1 or CDDL and GPL v2 + the Classpath exception.

Community
The Payara Server project is hosted on GitHub, allowing the community access to view and edit the source code. Payara encourages the community to contribute through raising bugs, suggesting new features and enhancements on GitHub.

Payara uses the Fork and Pull model. This means that if community members want to make any changes, they need to fork the Payara project and make their changes in their own repository. They will then need to create a pull request back into the Payara project's master branch to merge the changes into the main project.

Payara Services Ltd commercial enterprise versions, consultancy services, migration and support subscriptions also fund development and engineering effort of the Payara Server open source project.

Releases

 Payara Server 4.1.144 – 31 October 2014 – first release based on GlassFish 4 with added bug fixes and patches.
 Payara Server 4.1.151 – 30 January 2015 – integrating Hazelcast 3.4 and JSR107, upgraded JBatch module, added multi language distribution and some bug fixes.
 Payara Server 4.1.152 – 1 May 2015 – featuring the first release of Payara Micro and Payara Domain Template.
 Payara Server 4.1.153 – 31 July 2015 – featuring improvements for the Payara Micro API, a new auto-binding feature for the HTTP and HTTPS ports of Payara Micro instances; an update to the JCache (JSR107) API; updated Start-Domain Command; and Payara Blue, the Payara Server release for the IBM JDK, allowing AIX users to run Payara Server.
 Payara Server 4.1.1.154 – 23 October 2015 – first Payara Server release based on GlassFish 4.1. featuring 11 Updated Modules, 11 Enhancements and 25 Bug Fixes.
 Payara Server 4.1.1.161 – 29 January 2016 – featuring Slow SQL Logging and in-built Server Healthchecks.
 Payara Server 4.1.1.162 – 6 May 2016 – Updated clustering with Hazelcast, updated Docker images, new Payara Micro features, Asadmin Recorder, connection pool checker; eight new features, 20 enhancements and 37 bug fixes.
 Payara Server 4.1.1.163 - 16 August 2016 – added tech preview for Request Tracing, Notification Service, Hazelcast EJB Persistent Timer Store for Payara Micro, JMX Monitoring Agent; featuring 44 bug fixes, 34 enhancements, six new features and six component upgrades.
 Payara Server 4.1.1.164 - 14 November 2016 – added 34 bug fixes, 15 enhancements, 10 new features, eight component upgrades and a new version of Payara MicroProfile. The release featured extended Request Tracing, Enhanced control over implicit CDI scanning and redesigned Admin Console view of Hazelcast cluster members.
 Payara Server 4.1.1.171 - 20 February 2017 – added 30 bug fixes, 29 improvements, 18 new features, eight component upgrades and 5 security fixes for Payara Server and Payara Micro. Improvements include new notifiers for the Notification Service, Admin Console integration for the Health Check Service, Public API JAR and CDI Remote Events. 171 is the first LTS ( Long-Term-Support) release of Payara Server.
 Payara Server 4.1.2.172 – 22 May 2017 – added 53 bug fixes, eight new features, 29 improvements, eight component upgrades and one security fix for Payara Server and Payara Micro. Named a 'cloud and microservices' release, the improvements and new features included: JMS Client Support for Payara Micro; support for JCA adapters in Payara Micro; new Cloud Connectors for Apache Kafka, Amazon SQS, MQTT and Azure Service Bus; run Asadmin commands at boot in Payara Server; Maven plugin for Payara Micro; new notifiers for the Notification Service and enhanced environment variable references.
 Payara Server 4.1.2.173 – 15 August 2017 – added 58 bug fixes, 30 improvements, 12 new features, two security fixes and five component upgrades for Payara Server and Payara Micro. This release includes Payara Server / Micro 5 snapshots, features support for Eclipse MicroProfile 1.1; HealthCheck Service and Slow SQL Logger improvements; Payara Arquillian container; enhancements for Docker users, CDI Eventbus Notifier and more minor fixes and improvements.
 Payara Server 4.1.2.174 – 15 November 2017 – added over 100 bug fixes, five new features and 18 improvements including Soteria support, full MBean integration via the JMX Monitoring Service and wider support for environment variable substitution.
 Payara Server 4.1.2.181 – 12 February 2018 – added 25 bug fixes, 13 improvements, five new features, two security fixes and two component upgrades. Included support for MicroProfile 1.2 and a number of simple usability improvements. It is the last public release of Payara Server and Micro in the 4.x Community Stream.
 Payara Server 4.1.2.182 – 12 June 2018.
 Payara Server 4.1.2.183 – 4 September 2018 – This release featured MicroProfile 2.0 support including updates to: OpenTracing, OpenAPI, REST Client; OpenID Connect; Admin Console Changes/Improvements (Ordered config tree, New MicroProfile pages); Payara-Web.xml Deployment Descriptor.
 Payara Server 5.184 – 3 December 2018 – This release contained the following new features: Autocomplete Asadmin Commands; New Health Check checker to report status from MP Health Check endpoints; Allow using different security providers via JCE API; Create Native Kubernetes Cluster Mode for Domain Data Grid; Improve template placeholder replacements for custom MP metrics; Configure virtual servers for MP endpoints; Add a DNS Cluster Mode to Payara Micro; Support replacement of config values from Server Defined MP Config Sources; Create payara-resources.xml functionality and Make SecuritySupport resettable.
 Payara Server 5.191 – 6 March 2019 – This release featured approximately 40 bug fixes, 15 improvements and enhancements and  35 component upgrades. Also in this release, MicroProfile 2.1 updates OpenTracing to 1.2, bringing with it skip patterns, operation name providers, and a couple of extra usability improvements such as no longer tracing the other MicroProfile endpoints (e.g. /health).
 Payara Server 5.192 – 29 May 2019 – This release ships with support for JDK 11 in tech preview. It introduces the concept of a Docker node (also tech preview) as our first iteration of better native Docker integration. This release also brings our support of MicroProfile up to 2.2, providing updates to OpenAPI, Rest Client, and Fault Tolerance.
 Payara Server 5.193 – 29 August 2019 – This release featured 48 bug fixes, seven new features, 26 improvements, three component upgrades and  one security upgrade. 193 release included Dynamic Instance Naming, Monitoring Console in tech preview, Support for Metrics 2.0 and Structured Deployment Metrics.
 Payara Server 5.194 – 2 December 2019 – Featuring JDK 11 support, MicroProfile 3.2, Monitoring Console, 50 bug fixes, 13 new features, and 20 other improvements.
 Payara Server 5.201 – 3 March 2020 – Derby DB removed, Data Grid Encryption Tech preview, five new features, 12 improvements, 21 component upgrades, 31 bug fixes.
 Payara Server 5.2020.2 – 19 June 2020 - Version number format changed.
 Payara Server 5.2020.3 – 17 July 2020
 Payara Server 5.2020.4 – 14 August 2020
 Payara Server 5.2020.5 – 12 October 2020
 Payara Server 5.2020.6 – 11 November 2020
 Payara Server 5.2020.7 – 9 December 2020

All Payara Server release notes can be found in the documentation.

Payara Micro
Payara Micro is Payara Server’s microservices version and enables users to run war files from the command line without any application server installation. 70MB in size. Payara Micro also comes with a Java API so it can be embedded and launched from all Java applications.
Since 173 release (August 2017) Payara Micro is compatible with Eclipse MicroProfile.

Payara Cloud 

Payara Cloud is the next generation of cloud-native application runtime. It offers an easier way to run your Jakarta EE apps on the cloud. Simply select your war, click deploy, and watch your apps run on the cloud – automatically, like magic.

Support
Payara Server was originally developed in response to Oracle’s announcement to drop commercial support for GlassFish Open Source Edition. As such Payara offers a drop in replacement for GlassFish and support is available from Payara Services Ltd.

See also 

 List of application servers

References

External links 
 

Web server software programmed in Java
Free software application servers
Software using the CDDL license